Greatheart is a fantasy novel by Dixie Lee McKeone, set in the world of Birthright, and based on the Dungeons & Dragons game.

Plot summary
Greatheart is a novel in which a human named Greatheart, who was raised by elves, must protect a sacred grove.

Reception

Reviews
Kliatt
Backstab #7

References

1996 American novels
Birthright (campaign setting) novels